The Oulu Railway Station is located in the centre of Oulu, Finland, in the city district of Vaara. All trains are operated by VR. Nearby is the Oulu bus station for long-distance buses.

The railway station was built in 1886 when the Ostrobothnia railway line reached Oulu.

The railway from the south to Oulu was electrified in 1983, using overhead electric wires at 25 kV. The electrification northwards from Oulu to Rovaniemi was not completed until 2004. In 2006 the railway from Oulu to Iisalmi was also electrified. The fastest trains from Oulu to Helsinki are operated by VR's Pendolino trains.

Gallery

References

External links

VR – main website
VR – Oulu station information

Railway stations in North Ostrobothnia
Railway station
Railway station
Railway stations opened in 1886